Oenas is a genus of blister beetle related to the well-known Lytta vesicatoria (a.k.a. "Spanish Fly"). The genus is Mediterranean in its distribution (from Morocco & Spain, east to Caucasus, Palestine & Iran).

Meloidae